Hodo Nivica (1809–1852) was an Albanian activist leader known for his role in Albanian revolt of 1847. He was one of the few local leaders that escaped the massacre of Albanian beys. Although invited by Ottoman governor, suspicious of his real intentions he did not go to Monastir. After his participation in the revolt of 1847 he was pardoned by the Sultan. In 1852, together with Zenel Gjoleka he died fighting as a mercenary against Montenegrin forces. His grave is located in the Shpuza, Montenegro.

References

Sources

1809 births
1852 deaths
Albanian activists
People from Janina vilayet
19th-century Albanian people